The 1979 Paris–Nice was the 37th edition of the Paris–Nice cycle race and was held from 7 March to 14 March 1979. The race started in Paris and finished in Nice. The race was won by Joop Zoetemelk of the Miko team.

General classification

References

1979
1979 in road cycling
1979 in French sport
March 1979 sports events in Europe
1979 Super Prestige Pernod